John Kemble Tarbox (May 6, 1838 – May 28, 1887) was a U.S. Representative from Massachusetts.

Biography

Early life and education
Tarbox was born in that part of Methuen, Massachusetts that became incorporated into Lawrence, Massachusetts, Tarbox pursued classical studies, engaged in newspaper work, studied law and was admitted to the bar in 1860 and practiced law.

In May 1859 Tarbox married Sarah Ann Harmon. She died in 1874.

American Civil War service
During the Civil War he served in the Union Army as a first lieutenant in Company B of the Fourth Regiment, Massachusetts Volunteer Infantry.  He was mustered out with his regiment on August 28, 1863.

For a time after his military service Tarbox was the political editor of the Lawrence Sentinel.

Early public service career
Tarbox was a delegate at the 1864 Democratic National Convention, and an alternate delegate at the 1868 Democratic National Convention. Tarbox served as a member of the Massachusetts House of Representatives in 1868, 1870, and 1871, in the Massachusetts State Senate in 1872, and as the sixteenth Mayor of Lawrence from 1873 to 1874.

Congressional service
Tarbox was elected as a Democrat to the Forty-fourth Congress (March 4, 1875 – March 3, 1877).  He was an unsuccessful candidate for reelection in 1876 to the Forty-fifth Congress.

Later public service career
Tarbox was the City solicitor of Lawrence, Massachusetts, in 1882 and 1883.  From April 21, 1883 to May 28, 1887,  Tarbox was the Massachusetts State Insurance Commissioner.

Death and burial
Tarbox died in Boston, Massachusetts, on  May 28, 1887 and was interred in Bellevue Cemetery, Lawrence, Massachusetts.

See also

 1868 Massachusetts legislature
 1872 Massachusetts legislature

Notes

References
 Retrieved on 2008-02-15
 Harmon, Artemas Canfield:, The Harmon Genealogy, Comprising all Branches in New England, p. 120, (1920).
 Singer, Isidore:, The Annual Cyclopedia of Insurance in the United States., 1893–1894, p. 301, (1894).

External links
New York Times Obituary HARD WORK KILLED HIM.; A FAITHFUL PUBLIC SERVANT OF MASSACHUSETTS.

 

1838 births
1887 deaths
Democratic Party Massachusetts state senators
Mayors of Lawrence, Massachusetts
Democratic Party members of the Massachusetts House of Representatives
Massachusetts lawyers
American newspaper people
Union Army officers
People of Massachusetts in the American Civil War
19th-century American newspaper editors
Burials in Massachusetts
Democratic Party members of the United States House of Representatives from Massachusetts
American male journalists
19th-century American male writers
19th-century American politicians
19th-century American lawyers